KRI Teluk Wondama (527) is the ninth  of the Indonesian Navy.

Characteristics
She has a capacity of 367 troops, with complement of 111, in addition to ten Leopard main battle tanks or fifteen BMP-3F amphibious infantry fighting vehicles. Teluk Wondama also has two helipads with two hangars.

Service history
KRI Teluk Wondama was built by PT Bandar Abadi Shipyard, Batam. The ship was ordered on 12 April 2019, part of two ships contract of 360 billion Indonesian Rupiah (25.5 million US Dollar). Her keel was laid down on 19 December and she was assigned with yard number of AT-9.

Teluk Wondama, along with her sister  were launched on 27 February 2021, and officially named on 3 March. The ships were launched 8 months ahead of the scheduled 30 months, with the Chief of Staff of the Indonesian Navy Admiral Yudo Margono remarked during the ship naming ceremony that he should have invited Jaya Suprana, the founder of Indonesian World Records Museum, as according to him it's "..an achievement that must be carved into MURI".

Teluk Wondama and Teluk Weda were commissioned on 26 October 2021 at PT Bandar Abadi shipyard in Batam, after they were handed over ceremonially by Minister of Defense Prabowo Subianto to Chief of Staff of the Indonesian Navy Admiral Yudo Margono. The ship was assigned to the 3rd Fleet Command based in Sorong on 11 January 2023.

References

2021 ships
Teluk Bintuni-class tank landing ships
Amphibious warfare vessels of the Indonesian Navy